The Amazing Race Canada 6 (also known as The Amazing Race Canada: Heroes Edition) is the sixth season of The Amazing Race Canada, a reality game show based on the American series The Amazing Race. It features ten teams of two consisting of everyday Canadian heroes in a race across Canada and across the world and is hosted by Jon Montgomery. The grand prize includes a  cash payout, a "once-in-a-lifetime" trip for two around the world, and two 2018 Chevrolet Traverse Redlines.

The season premiered on July 3, 2018 with the season finale airing on September 11, 2018.

Engaged first responders Courtney Berglind and Adam Kovacs were the winners of this season. They were the first male/female team to win in the Canadian edition of The Amazing Race.

Production

Development and filming

On October 12, 2017, CTV announced that the show was renewed for its sixth season.

Filming of The Amazing Race Canada 6 began on April 23, 2018, when the show's Facebook page broadcast the start of the season during its first of six "Jon on the Road: Presented by Chevrolet Facebook Live", which featured Devon Soltendieck of etalk interviewing host Jon Montgomery at the Starting Line, Hatley Gardens in Colwood, British Columbia, before the competition commenced. The five subsequent livestreams featured Jon during filming of the season offering hints about destinations on the racecourse.

During the airing of the episode for Leg 10, a message in white on a black background ("Dedicated to the people of Fredericton, New Brunswick") indirectly recognized that the Fredericton shooting had occurred since the filming of the leg and prior to the episode airing. The same episode also featured Fredericton Police Chief Leanne J. Fitch as the Pit Stop greeter.

This season's visit to Fredericton meant that all 13 of Canada's provincial and territorial capitals were featured at least once in the then six seasons of The Amazing Race Canada. This was the first season in the then six seasons of The Amazing Race Canada that did not visit the province of Quebec.

Season 5 winners Sam Lambert and Paul Mitskopoulos were the local Pit Stop greeters of Leg 6 in their hometown of Toronto.

This was the first season of The Amazing Race Canada to place the U-Turn boards at the Detour decision points rather than after the Detours.

Marketing
Chevrolet continued sponsoring the show and was the sole sponsor of the Facebook Live events. Canadian Tire's outfitter brand Woods also continued their sponsorship from the previous season. New sponsors are Alcon Dailies contact lenses, Dempster's Bakery, Royal Canadian Legion and SkipTheDishes.

Cast
The cast included Olympic bronze medalist in skeleton Mellisa Hollingsworth. Courtney Berglind previously appeared in episodes 23 & 24 of Big Brother Canada 4 to compete in a Head of Household award challenge on behalf of her sister, houseguest Kelsey Faith.

Future appearances
Martina & Phil appeared on an online weekly series companion series for The Amazing Race Canada 7 called "Tastes of the Race", in which they faced off in a cooking competition inspired by the season's locations while using Dempster's Bakery products.

Results
The following teams participated in this season, each listed along with their placements in each leg and relationships as identified by the program. Note that this table is not necessarily reflective of all content broadcast on television, owing to the inclusion or exclusion of some data. Placements are listed in finishing order.

A  placement with a dagger indicates that the team was eliminated.
An  placement with a double-dagger indicates that the team was the last to arrive at a pit stop in a non-elimination leg, and had to perform a Speed Bump task in the following leg.
 An italicized and underlined placement indicates that the team was the last to arrive at a pit stop, but there was no rest period at the pit stop and all teams were instructed to continue racing. There was no required Speed Bump task in the next leg.
An  indicates that the team used an Express Pass on that leg to bypass one of their tasks.
A  indicates that the team used the U-Turn and a  indicates the team on the receiving end of the U-Turn.
A  indicates the leg has the Face Off, while a  indicates the team that lost the Face Off.

Notes

Prizes
The prize for each leg is awarded to the first place team for that leg.

Leg 1 – A trip for two to Tokyo, Japan
Leg 2 – A trip for two to the South of France
Klondike Campsite Set Up Challenge –  from Woods. Awarded to Todd & Anna.
Leg 3 – A trip for two to Boston, Massachusetts
Leg 4 – A trip for two to Ho Chi Minh City, Vietnam
Leg 5 – A trip for two to London, England
Leg 7 – A trip for two to New York City, New York
Leg 8 – A trip for two to Istanbul, Turkey
Leg 9 – A trip for two to Sydney, Australia
Leg 10 – A trip for two to Buenos Aires, Argentina
Leg 11 – A  cash payout, a "once-in-a-lifetime" trip for two around the world, and a 2018 Chevrolet Traverse Redline for each team member

Race summary

Leg 1 (British Columbia)

Airdate: July 3, 2018
Colwood, British Columbia, Canada (Hatley Park National Historic Site – Hatley Gardens) (Starting Line)
 Swartz Bay (Swartz Bay Ferry Terminal) to Delta (Tsawwassen Ferry Terminal)
 Squamish (Sea-to-Sky Gondola – Panorama Trail) 
Squamish (Squamish Days Loggers' Sports Festival) 
Squamish (Darrell Bay)
Britannia Beach (Britannia Mine Museum – Mill No.3) 

In this season's first Roadblock, one team member had to ride a zip-line to a net suspended high above the Mamquam Valley. Attached to a bungee cord, they then had to jump from the net to grab a plush beaver toy and exchange it for their next clue. If they missed, they had to wait at the back of the line to try again.

In this leg's second Roadblock, the team member who did not perform the previous Roadblock had to complete a loggersports activity by climbing an  pole, with the aid of spurs and a harness, to retrieve their next clue at the top.

Additional tasks
Before leaving Hatley Gardens, teams had to search the grounds around Hatley Castle to find their backpacks with their first clue.
At the Sea-to-Sky Gondola, teams had to sign for one of five gondolas to the top of the mountain, where they found the clue for the first Roadblock.
At Darrell Bay, teams had to put on wetsuits and steer a paddleboard toward 20 buoys floating in the bay, each tied to a trap containing a live crab below. They had to choose a trap, pull it up, then return to shore with it to have the crab measured by a fisherman. If the crab was regulation size, they received their next clue.

Additional note
In a parking lot outside Hatley Castle, teams found a 2018 Chevrolet Cruze hatchback, which served as their transportation on this leg.

Leg 2 (British Columbia → Yukon)

Airdate: July 10, 2018
Squamish (Executive Suites Hotel & Resort Squamish) (Pit Start)
 Vancouver (Vancouver International Airport) to Dawson City, Yukon (Dawson City Airport)
Dawson City (Dredge No. 4)
Dawson City (Bank of British North America) 
 Dawson City (Palace Grand Theatre or Diamond Tooth Gertie's Gambling Hall)
Dawson City (Midnight Dome) 

This season's first Detour was a choice between Dance or Chance. In Dance, teams had to travel to the Palace Grand Theatre. After donning burlesque costumes, team would watch a can-can performance. Teams would then join the performers on stage and had to perform the dance to the satisfaction of Madame Terry to receive their next clue. In Chance, teams had to travel to Diamond Tooth Gertie's Gambling Hall and watch a round of blackjack. After observing the round, team members would then assume the role of dealer, and both members had to deal out a hand to casino patrons and properly pay out casino chips to receive their next clue from the pit boss. If teams made a mistake, then they would have to go to the back of the line and wait for another attempt.

Additional tasks
After arriving at Dawson City Airport, each team found a parked 2018 Chevrolet Silverado "High Country Edition" truck, which served as transportation for the rest of this leg, and had to load a tent and camping supplies from sponsor Woods into their truck. Teams then drove to Dredge No. 4 and had to correctly assemble a campsite so that it matched an example setup to receive their next clue from camp director Jackie. In addition, the team that assembled their campsite the fastest would win a $5,000 prize from Woods.
At the Bank of British North America, teams received a global positioning system receiver with nine pre-programmed destinations. Teams had to search Dawson City to find one gold coin at each of five different locations: the SS Keno, the George Mercer Dawson commemorative plaque near the Yukon Hotel, the Robert W. Service Cabin, the Red Feather Saloon, and the Clapp and Jones Steamer at the Dawson City Firefighter Museum. Teams could also find an Express Pass at three different locations: the Former Post Office, the Dänojà Zho Cultural Centre, and the Hillside Cemetery. One location, the Commissioner's Residence, had neither a coin nor an Express Pass. After finding the five coins, teams had to return to the Bank of British North America to exchange their coins for their next clue.

Leg 3 (Yukon → British Columbia)

Airdate: July 17, 2018
Dawson City (Downtown Hotel) (Pit Start)
 Dawson City (Dawson City Airport) to Vancouver, British Columbia (Vancouver International Airport)
 (Seaplane) Vancouver (Burrard Inlet – Vancouver Harbour Air Terminal) to Ganges, Salt Spring Island (Ganges Harbour) 
Ganges (Salt Spring Saturday Market)
Mount Erskine Provincial Park (Mount Erskine Access Trail – Fairy Doors)
 Vesuvius (Vesuvius Ferry Terminal) to Crofton, Vancouver Island (Crofton Ferry Terminal)
 Duncan (Vancouver Island Motorsport Circuit) 
Duncan (Pacific Northwest Raptors) 
Shawnigan Lake (Kinsol Trestle) 

For their Speed Bump, Zainab & Monica had to correctly identify eight flavour-infused fleur de sel samples before they could continue racing.

In this leg's first Roadblock, teams had to travel from Mount Erskine Provincial Park to Vancouver Island Motorsport Circuit, where one team member had to complete a full lap in a 2018 Chevrolet Corvette Grand Sport convertible around the circuit within three minutes, without exceeding , to receive their next clue from their instructor.

In this leg's second Roadblock, the team member who did not perform the previous Roadblock had to observe a silent demonstration of how to tie a falconer's knot. After donning a protective glove and having a live raptor placed on their arm, racers had to correctly tie the knot using the bird's leash to the glove's metal loop within 15 seconds to receive their next clue.

Additional tasks
At Salt Spring Saturday Market, each team had to eat two whole blueberry pies to receive keys to 2018 Chevrolet Bolt EV hatchbacks, which served as transportation for the rest of this leg, containing their next clue. Both Todd & Anna and Leanne & Mar used their respective Express Passes to bypass this task.
At Mount Erskine Access Trail, teams had to search through the park's ten fairy doors to find their next clue hidden behind three of the doors. Nancy & Mellisa used their Express Pass to bypass this task.

Leg 4 (British Columbia → Indonesia)

Airdate: July 24, 2018
Duncan (Duncan Station) (Pit Start)
 Victoria (Victoria International Airport) to Jakarta, Indonesia (Soekarno–Hatta International Airport)
West Jakarta (Old City – Fatahillah Square) (Overnight Rest)
North Jakarta (Pelabuhan Sunda Kelapa)
South Jakarta (Kebayoran Baru – Pasar Burung Barito) 
 South Jakarta (  or Mayestik Market)
South Jakarta (Kebayoran Baru – Gedung Teater Bulungan) 
Central Jakarta (Merdeka Square overlooking the National Monument) 

This leg's Detour was a choice between Ular or Kebaya. In Ular, teams had to find a snake handler within Langsat Park, choose a container, and completely clean the live snake inside. Once approved, they then moved to a medical station where each team member had to attach a leech to their partner's arm and let it suck their blood for five minutes before receiving their next clue from a doctor. In Kebaya, teams had to find a marked sewing stall in Mayestik Market. Using a sewing machine, they had to sew two panels of fabric, then sew each panel to the underside of the lapels on the women's blazer known as a kebaya to receive their next clue from a seamstress.

In this leg's Roadblock, one team member had to perform the Saman dance. After dressing in costume, they had to learn and correctly perform a series of complex hand and body movements in sync with a group of dancers on stage to receive their next clue from the drummer.

Additional tasks
At Fatahillah Square, teams had to sign up for one of three departure times the next morning. They then had to watch a traditional welcoming performance by dancers in ondel-ondel costumes before receiving their next clue.
At Pelabuhan Sunda Kelapa, teams had to carry durians by hand from a truck and onto a pinisi until they filled a crate to receive their next clue.

Leg 5 (Indonesia → Ontario)

Airdate: July 31, 2018
Jakarta (AYANA Midplaza Jakarta) (Pit Start)
 Jakarta (Soekarno–Hatta International Airport) to Toronto, Ontario, Canada (Toronto Pearson International Airport)
Ingersoll (CAMI Automotive Assembly Plant) (Overnight Rest)
Stratford (Festival Theatre) 
 Stratford (Avon River – Avon Boat Rentals or Rhéo Thompson Candies)
Stratford (Stratford City Hall) 

In this leg's Roadblock, one team member had to dress in Elizabethan costume, then learn and convincingly act out a sword fighting duel scene, ending with the racer's "death", to receive their next clue.

This leg's Detour was a choice between Pedal or Package. In Pedal, teams had to use a paddle boat to navigate part of the Avon River in Stratford to find and collect six illustrated cards. When placed in the correct order, the pieces would form a rebus that encoded the words "Queen of the Square". In Package, teams travelled to Rhéo Thompson Candies, where they had to correctly assemble and package ten boxes of assorted mint chocolates and ten boxes of assorted jelly candies to receive their next clue, which only read "Queen of the Square".

Additional tasks
After arriving at Toronto Pearson International Airport, each team found a parked 2018 Chevrolet Equinox "True North Edition", which served as their transportation for the rest of this leg and the first part of Leg 6, containing their next clue instructing them to travel to the place where their car was assembled in Ontario. They were left to figure out that this referred to CAMI Automotive in Ingersoll and not the Chevrolet assembly plants located in Oshawa and St. Catharines, Ontario. Once there, teams found a sign-up board to determine the order they would be admitted the next morning, in five-minute intervals. 
Inside CAMI Automotive, teams had to watch a silent demonstration and follow the 19 steps to correctly assemble one Equinox front door to receive their next clue from the plant manager.
The clues following the Detour only told teams to find "Queen of the Square". Teams had to figure out that this was a cinema that holds film screenings inside Stratford's city hall auditorium. Teams would then find Jon Montgomery and the Pit Stop mat inside.

Leg 6 (Ontario)

Airdate: August 7, 2018
Toronto (Toronto City Hall – East Tower Observation Deck)
Toronto (Yonge–Dundas Square) 
 (TTC Subway) Toronto (Dundas Station to Lansdowne Station)
Toronto (The Monkey's Paw) 
 Toronto (El Convento Rico or Versus Coffee)
Toronto (North York Harvest Food Bank)
Toronto (Ireland Park) 

In this leg's Roadblock, one team member had to choose a 2018 Chevrolet Spark and load it with a variety of provided household items, without putting any in the passenger seat and not obstructing vision through the rear-view mirror. Then, using the backup camera, they had to reverse the vehicle through a slalom course without knocking over any cones to park within a marked space. Once completed, they had to contact OnStar service to be told their next destination.

This leg's Detour was a choice between Walk the Part or Latte Art. In Walk the Part, teams had to dress in colourful costumes, then learn and correctly perform a Vogue routine with a dance troupe in front of an audience to receive their next clue. In Latte Art, teams had to become baristas by correctly preparing two cups of latte and re-creating a leaf pattern of latte art in the foam using food coloring and proper pouring technique to receive their next clue.

Additional tasks
Upon arrival in Toronto, teams travelled to City Hall, where they had to make their way up to the observation deck on the 27th floor of the east tower and search for a red and yellow Amazing Race flag on the roof of a building at their next destination: Yonge–Dundas Square.
The clue given via OnStar after the Roadblock instructed teams to only travel via TTC Subway to The Monkey's Paw bookstore, where they would find the Double U-Turn board. Here, they received a token to insert into the Biblio-Mat, a book vending machine, and would find their next clue inside the dispensed book.
At North York Harvest Food Bank, teams had to choose a list of various bread products donated by sponsor Dempster's Bakery and had to pack the specified quantities of each product into red boxes to receive their next clue.

Leg 7 (Ontario → Manitoba)

Airdate: August 14, 2018
Toronto (Coronation Park) (Pit Start)
 Toronto (Toronto Pearson International Airport) to Winnipeg, Manitoba (Winnipeg James Armstrong Richardson International Airport)
Winnipeg (The Forks – Canadian Museum for Human Rights)
 Winnipeg (Royal Winnipeg Ballet or SkipTheDishes Headquarters)
 Winnipeg (Royal Canadian Legion St. James Branch #4)
Winnipeg (The Forks – The Forks Market) 
Winnipeg (Assiniboine Park – Leo Mol Sculpture Garden) 

This leg's Detour was a choice between Tights or Bites. In Tights, teams made their way to the Royal Winnipeg Ballet. After donning ballet attire, teams had to learn and properly perform the Danse des petits cygnes from Tchaikovsky's Swan Lake to the satisfaction of the Ballet's artistic director to receive their next clue. In Bites, teams made their way to SkipTheDishes' Winnipeg logistics headquarters and were given two food orders on the company's mobile app. After picking up the food from the affiliated restaurants, teams had to deliver the food to the correct addresses. If teams received two positive reviews, they would then receive their next clue.

For this season's first Face Off, teams had to travel to St. James Branch #4 of the Royal Canadian Legion and compete against each other in a game of darts, in which teams had to hit all 20 sections of a dartboard. If a team member was able to hit the bullseye, they could remove any two sections from their dartboard. The first team that struck all 20 sections won their next clue, while the loser had to wait for another team. The last team remaining at the Face Off had to turn over an hourglass and wait out a time penalty before moving on.

In this leg's Roadblock, one team member had to correctly perform the three cups and balls magic trick in front of a crowd and then make a dog balloon animal to receive their next clue from a magician.

Additional task
At the Canadian Museum for Human Rights, teams were presented with 18 different quotations from human rights leaders. After searching the museum, teams had to match each quotation to the correct person to receive their next clue.

Additional notes
At Toronto Pearson International Airport, teams had to purchase tickets on one of two available flights, each carrying three teams, to Winnipeg.
After arriving at Winnipeg James Armstrong Richardson International Airport, each team found a parked 2018 Chevrolet Colorado ZR2 truck containing their next clue, which served as their transportation for the rest of this leg.

Leg 8 (Manitoba → Prince Edward Island)

Airdate: August 21, 2018
Winnipeg (Portage and Main) (Pit Start)
 Winnipeg (Winnipeg James Armstrong Richardson International Airport) to Charlottetown, Prince Edward Island (Charlottetown Airport)
Charlottetown (Beaconsfield Historic House)
 Charlottetown (The Humble Barber)
New London (The Table Culinary Studio) 
 Brackley Beach (The Great Canadian Soap Company) or North Rustico (Blue Bay Farms)
Cavendish (Crossfire Adventure Paintball)
Cavendish (Cavendish Beach) 

For their Speed Bump, Nancy & Mellisa had to cut the hair of two women, who would donate their hair to the Canadian Cancer Society, before they could continue racing.

In this leg's Roadblock, one team member had to unscramble the words of four courses on a menu and serve the dishes to a restaurant patron to receive their next clue from the chef.

This leg's Detour was a choice between Suds or Spuds. In Suds, teams had to travel to The Great Canadian Soap Company and milk a goat to a specified amount. Then, teams had to identify ten uniquely-scented soaps by smell only to receive their next clue. In Spuds, teams had to travel to Blue Bay Farms and till a section of a field to create four rows. Teams then had to properly cut and plant potatoes, each containing an eye and spaced a hoe's width (4 to 5 inches, or 10 to 13 cm) apart, in their rows to receive their next clue from a farmer.

Additional tasks
At Beaconsfield Historic House, teams were directed to find three of nine Eckhart mice located throughout downtown Charlottetown. Teams would find a miniature clue envelope that contained a piece of their next clue attached to the mice located at the Victoria Row arch, the Confederation Centre of the Arts box office, and the Merchantman Fresh Seafood & Oyster Bar. 
After finding the three miniature clues, teams were only instructed to drive to the intersection of Route 6 and Grahams Road to find their next clue.
At Crossfire Adventure Paintball, teams had to search a paintball course for their next clue while attempting to avoid zombies firing paintball guns. Teams had to wait out a one-minute penalty for each paintball hit they took.

Additional note
After arriving at Charlottetown Airport, each team found a parked 2018 Chevrolet Volt, which served as their transportation for the rest of this leg.

Leg 9 (Prince Edward Island → Mexico)

Airdate: August 28, 2018
Charlottetown (Queen's Wharf) (Pit Start)
 Charlottetown (Charlottetown Airport) to Mexico City, Mexico (Mexico City International Airport)
Mexico City (Plaza de la República – Monumento a la Revolución)
Mexico City (Frontón México) 
 Mexico City (Jardín del Centenario – Fuente de los Coyotes or Iztapalapa – Central de Abasto)
Mexico City (Cuauhtémoc – La Condesa Neighbourhood)
Mexico City (Alameda Central overlooking Palacio de Bellas Artes) 

In this leg's Roadblock, one team member had to play jai alai. Using a wicker scoop called a cesta, they had to hurl a ball so that it hit the back wall and landed between the third and fifth lines to receive their next clue. Team members would only have three throws per attempt.

This leg's Detour was a choice between Muertos or Mercado. In Muertos, each team member had to select a Day of the Dead calavera design and perfectly paint their design onto their partner's face to receive their next clue from a makeup artist. In Mercado, teams had to search Central de Abasto, the world's largest market, for four marked stalls and purchase cilantro, green chili peppers, onions, tomatoes, and limes. Then, teams had to combine their ingredients to make pico de gallo to receive their next clue.

Additional tasks
At Monumento a la Revolución, teams had to ride the elevator to the top of the monument. There, teams received a video message on a tablet computer from their loved ones, who would inform them of their next destination: Frontón México.
In a marked house in La Condesa, each team member had to choose one of four telenovela characters to play, memorize a script written entirely in Mexican Spanish, and then perform the dramatic scene to the director's satisfaction to receive their next clue.

Leg 10 (Mexico → New Brunswick)

Airdate: September 4, 2018
Mexico City (Angel of Independence) (Pit Start)
 Mexico City (Mexico City International Airport) to Fredericton, New Brunswick, Canada (Fredericton International Airport)
Fredericton (Garrison District – Officers' Square and City Hall)
 Oromocto (CFB Gagetown)
 Fredericton (University of New Brunswick – Lady Beaverbrook Gymnasium)
 Fredericton (Beaverbrook Art Gallery)
Fredericton (Government House) 

This season's final Detour was a choice between Fit or Fly, both with a limit of two stations. In Fit, one team member at a time had to memorize and complete four fitness test exercises including 20-meter rushes, sandbag lifts, intermittent loaded shuttles, and a sandbag drag. If teams could correctly complete the exercises in a combined time of less than 18 minutes, they would receive their next clue. In Fly, teams had to operate a Griffon helicopter flight simulator. They had to navigate a simulation of Downtown Montreal and successfully land on the roof of the Bell Centre in under five minutes to receive their next clue.

For this season's final Face Off, teams travelled to the campus of the University of New Brunswick, where they found the Lady Beaverbrook Gymnasium. Teams competed against each other in a game of three-on-three 15-minute wheelchair basketball using half the court. Each team would receive one additional player who could pass but could not block or score. The team with more points after 15 minutes would receive their next clue from Dave Durepos, while the loser had to wait for another team. The last team remaining at the Face Off had to turn over an hourglass and wait out a time penalty before moving on.

In this leg's Roadblock, one team member had to listen to six questions from a Wolastoqiyik elder in Wolastoqey about six Wolastoqiyik paintings inside the Beaverbrook Art Gallery. Team members had to find out which painting corresponded to which question by observing the paintings' English and Wolastoqey descriptions and had to respond to the questions with the correct Wolastoqey painting title to receive their next clue.

Additional task
At Officers' Square, teams had to watch a changing of the guard ceremony, then watch a seemingly-similar ceremony at City Hall; both performed by members of The Royal Canadian Regiment. Teams had to spot the one difference between the two ceremonies (the ceremonial guard at Officers' Square took one extra step) and tell the commander to receive their next clue.

Leg 11 (New Brunswick → Alberta)

Airdate: September 11, 2018
 Fredericton (Fredericton International Airport) to Calgary, Alberta (Calgary International Airport)
Calgary (Calgary International Airport – Airport Traffic Control Tower) 
 Calgary (Calgary International Airport – Apron 2) to Canmore (Alpine Helicopters Inc.) via Kananaskis Country (Mount Fable)
 Banff National Park (Sunshine Village) 
Banff (Banff National Park Administration Building and Banff Avenue)
Banff (Bow River)
 Banff (Fairmont Banff Springs Golf Club – Tunnel Nine 5th Hole) 

In this leg's first Roadblock, one team member had to enter an air traffic control simulation room and had to memorize, without taking notes, a 30-second automatic terminal information service transmission containing meteorological information surrounding the airport. After memorizing the transmission, team members had to make their way to the top of the tower and correctly recite the transmission to the Nav Canada senior controller to receive their next clue.

In this season's final Roadblock, the team member who did not perform the previous Roadblock had to participate in two winter sports. First, they would be harnessed to two dogs and had to ski two laps around a skijoring track. Then the team member had to complete the Slush Cup by sledding on a marked course down a ski run and across a pool of cold water to receive their next clue.

Additional tasks
Upon arrival in Calgary, teams had to search near the airport's control tower for their next clue.
After completing the first Roadblock, teams made their way to Apron 2 and took a helicopter ride to Mount Fable. After landing on the mountain's summit, they had to search for their next clue. Teams then took off again to land in Canmore at the helicopter company's home base to proceed by taxi to Sunshine Village in Banff.
At Banff National Park Administration Building, teams were directed to search ten marked stores along Banff Avenue to find at least two marked souvenirs that represented items or tasks they encountered from each of the 11 legs. Some legs were represented by more than two souvenirs. After finding the souvenirs, teams had to return to the Banff National Park Administration Building and place the souvenirs on a display in the proper order to receive their next clue.

{| class="wikitable"
|-
!Leg
!Location
!Associated Souvenirs
|-
!1
|Squamish
|Stuffed Beaver Toy, Toy Ferry Boat, & Plastic Crab Miniature
|-
!2
|Yukon
|Gold Coin & Dawson City house scale model
|-
!3
|Gulf Islands
|Fairy Doors, Plastic Blueberry Pie Slice, & Sports Car Scale Model
|-
!4
|Jakarta
|Flag of Indonesia, National Monument Scale Model, & Ondel-ondel Statuettes
|-
!5
|Stratford
|Stratford City Hall Postcard, Plastic Elizabethan sword miniature, & Car Door Scale Model
|-
!6
|Toronto
|Toy TTC Subway Car, Latte Cup, & Book
|-
!7
|Winnipeg
|Cups and Balls Magic Equipment, CMHR Scale Model, Royal Canadian Legion Badge, & Dartboard Trophy
|-
!8
|Prince Edward Island
|Eckhart Mouse, Restaurant Table and Menu Miniature, & Zombie Statuettes
|-
!9
|Mexico City
|Flag of Mexico, Jai Alai Trophy, Monumento a la Revolución Scale Model, & Calavera
|-
!10
|Fredericton
|Wolastoqiyik Painting Miniature, Ceremonial Guard Statuette, & Scale Model Basketball
|-
!11
|Banff
|Toy Helicopter & Stuffed Siberian Husky
|}
After finding the souvenirs, teams had to ride a zip-line across the Bow River and then raft the river to the Fairmont Banff Springs Golf Club. Once there, teams had to find the Finish Line at the fifth hole of the nine-hole Tunnel Nine course (not the adjacent eighteen-hole course).

Episode title quotes
Episode titles are often taken from quotes made by the racers.
"Just a Beaver Hero" – Courtney (of Courtney & Adam)
"Fiddler's Fart" – Nancy
"Sounds Like a Wild Boar" – Zainab
"Just Suck My Blood Please" – Mar
"You Gotta Whip That Cream" – Martina
"Smells Like Sweat and Fun" – Dylan
"Poodle Time" – Dylan
"Those Zombies Are Honing In On Us" – Nancy
"The Battle of the Two Courtney's" – Courtney (of Taylor & Courtney)
"The Plan Is Simple. Win!" – Kwame
"The Summer of Heroes" – Producer Named

Ratings
Viewership includes initial date of viewing plus seven day DVR playback.

References

External links

 06
2018 Canadian television seasons
Television shows filmed in British Columbia
Television shows filmed in Yukon
Television shows filmed in Indonesia
Television shows filmed in Ontario
Television shows filmed in Winnipeg
Television shows filmed in Prince Edward Island
Television shows filmed in Mexico
Television shows filmed in New Brunswick
Television shows filmed in Alberta